PM2FGG (101.0 FM), on-air name Jak 101 FM or Jak FM, is an adult contemporary radio station in Jakarta, Indonesia. In 2001, Jak FM held 6% radio market share. The radio company, PT Suara Irama Indah, was the first commercial FM radio station in the country.

History

Suara Irama Indah era
After Elshinta Radio was bought (possibly by Salim Group) in the late 1970s, Soejoso Karsono created Radio Suara Irama Indah. Sudibyo Karsono also contributed to Irama Indah radio. Later the radio changed into B-FM and Radio One in the late 1990s.

Jak FM 
Jak FM changed the branding only Since 18 September 2000 & Launching since 10 January 2001 to present. To cater youngsters and more varied listeners, Jak FM later added new music, mostly Western music. Jak FM slowly reduced classic hits (now on Most Radio) and added new announcers, including morning show DJ Ronal Surapradja and Tike Prie.

Programming
Jak FM operates for 18 hours (06.00 (all time in UTC+7)-00.00) . Outside operating hours, Jak FM plays automated music. Daily programs include:

 Sarapan Seru (Ronal, Tike)
 Jak Best Music (various announcers)
 Joki 3 In 1 (Molan, Gita)

References

Radio stations in Jakarta
Mahaka Media